The Sorbian March was a frontier district on the eastern border of East Francia in the 9th through 11th centuries. It was composed of several counties bordering the Sorbs. The Sorbian March seems to have comprised the eastern part of Thuringia. 

The Sorbian March was sometimes referred to as the Thuringian March. The term "Sorbian March" appears only four times in the Annales Fuldenses.

History 
Three rulers are recorded: Poppo, Thachulf, and Radulf. The commanders of the Sorbian March bore the title dux Sorabici (limitis) in the Annales, but are also referred to elsewhere as counts (comites), margraves (marchiones), and dukes of Thuringia (duces Thuringorum). The march was probably ruled primarily by the Babenberg family.  

The boundary between Thuringia and the Sorbs was defined as the Saale river by Einhard, writing in the 830s:  ("the river Saale, which divides the Thuringii and the Sorbs"). Erfurt was then the chief economic centre of eastern Thuringia. The Sorbian March probably (loosely) included the land east of the Saale as far as the Elster and the Pleisse, which might have been controlled by castles. The Sorbian March may have been only the area west of the Saale, east of it, or on both sides. 

The Sorbian March was frequently troubled in the 9th century by Slavic insurrections, who were tributaries of the Germans. In the 10th century the march formed part of the vast marca Geronis from 937 until 965. During this period, the Sorbs were reduced to serfdom and the march was largely pacified. After 965, it formed a part of the March of Meissen.

Sources 
 
Reuter, Timothy (trans.) The Annals of Fulda. (Manchester Medieval series, Ninth-Century Histories, Volume II.) Manchester: Manchester University Press, 1992.

Notes and references

Further reading

 

Marches of the Holy Roman Empire